Americium(III) fluoride or americium trifluoride is the chemical compound composed of americium and fluorine with the formula AmF3. It is a water soluble, pink salt.

References

Americium compounds
Fluorides
Actinide halides